Moretto is a surname, and may refer to:

Moretto, or Moretto da Brescia, (c. 1498–1554), Italian Renaissance painter (in his case Il Moretto was a nickname)
Angie Moretto, NHL player
Enrico Moretto, Italian fighter ace
Graziella Moretto, actress 
Marcelo Moretto de Souza, Brazilian footballer
Nelly Moretto, musician
Sara Moretto, politician